Charles Howard Pelton (born August 15, 1940) was an American politician in the state of Iowa.

Pelton was born in Clinton, Iowa. He attended the University of Iowa and is a lawyer. He served in the Iowa House of Representatives from 1967 to 1973 as a Republican.

References

1940 births
Living people
People from Clinton, Iowa
University of Iowa alumni
Iowa lawyers
Republican Party members of the Iowa House of Representatives